Dr. Jekyll and Mr. Hyde is a 1920 American silent horror film produced by Famous Players-Lasky and released through Paramount/Artcraft. The film, which stars John Barrymore, is an adaptation of the 1886 novella Strange Case of Dr Jekyll and Mr Hyde by Robert Louis Stevenson. John S. Robertson directed the production, and Clara Beranger wrote the screenplay, based on the 1887 stage play by Thomas Russell Sullivan that in turn was based on the novel.

The story, set in late Victorian London, portrays the tragic consequences of a doctor's experiments in separating the dual personalities he thinks define all humans: one good, the other evil. The film is now in the public domain.

Plot 
Henry Jekyll (John Barrymore) is a doctor of medicine living and working in London in the late 1880s. When he is not treating the poor in his free clinic, he is in his laboratory experimenting. Sir George Carew (Brandon Hurst), the father of Jekyll’s fiancé Millicent (Martha Mansfield), is suspicious of the young doctor’s intentions and often irritated by his tardiness and highmindedness. "No man", Carew observes, "could be as good as he looks." Following dinner one evening, Carew taunts his prospective son-in-law in front of their mutual friends and debates with him about the causes and effects of a person's personality, insisting that every man is fundamentally composed of two "selves" who are in continual conflict. "A man cannot destroy the savage in him by denying its impulses", instructs Carew. "The only way to get rid of a temptation is to yield to it."

Reflecting on Sir George's comments, Jekyll begins his research and experiments into separating the two basic natures of man, the good and the evil. Finally, after much trial and error, he develops a potion that rapidly transforms him into a hideous, evil counterpart, a man he refers to as Edward Hyde. When in the form and consciousness of Hyde, Jekyll is not recognizable as himself, so to facilitate his bad side's access to his own home and adjacent laboratory, the doctor informs his trusty servant Poole (George Stevens) that Mr. Hyde is to have "full authority and liberty" at the residence.

Utilizing his potion, Jekyll literally begins to live a double life: the compassionate and gentlemanly doctor by day, and the lustful, hunchbacked "creature" who ventures out largely at night. As Hyde, he lurks about the seediest parts of London, frequenting opium dens, bars, and music halls—anywhere he can satisfy his "dark indulgences". He rents a small furnished room in the area and brings Gina (Nita Naldi), a young woman and exotic dancer, to live with him. Soon, however, Hyde tires of her company and forces her to leave.

Although Jekyll has developed a counter-potion that transforms Hyde back to the doctor’s original appearance and character, each time he takes the potion to become Hyde, the beast becomes increasingly more vile and physically more hideous. Meanwhile, Millicent worries about the absence of her fiancé, so Sir George calls on Jekyll, but the young man is not at home. Sir George then encounters Hyde in a nearby street, where the brute has just knocked a small boy to the ground and injured him. To make recompense for his actions, he goes and gets a check which he returns to the boy's father. Carew notices that the check has been signed by Dr. Jekyll. He confronts Poole, who tells him the story of Edward Hyde.

Hyde now returns to the lab; drinks the counter-potion and changes once again into his original form. Sir George finds the transformed Jekyll in the lab and demands to know about his relationship with Mr. Hyde, threatening to break off his daughter’s engagement to the doctor if he does not answer his questions. The threat enrages Jekyll, so much so that the stress itself triggers his retransformation to Hyde. Horrified in witnessing the change, Sir George flees out of the lab, but Hyde catches him in the courtyard and beats him to death with his stout, club-like walking stick. Hyde then runs to his apartment and destroys any evidence there that might link him to Jekyll. After barely avoiding the police, the creature returns to the lab, where he drinks the counter-potion and reverts to Jekyll.

In the ensuing days, while Millicent mourns over her father’s murder, Jekyll is tormented by the thoughts of his misdeeds as Hyde. Soon, the ingredient needed to make the counter-potion is depleted and cannot be found in all of London. Jekyll therefore confines himself to his locked lab, fearing he might become Hyde at any moment. Millicent finally goes to see him, but as she knocks on the lab's door, he begins transforming into Hyde. Before he opens the door, Jekyll consumes poison in a ring he wears, one that he had taken from Gina. Now fully transformed into Hyde, he lets Millicent in, locks the door, and grabs her in his arms. Suddenly, he starts convulsing. Millicent runs from the lab and her shouts for help attract Poole, Jekyll's longtime friend Dr. Richard Lanyon, and another friend, John Utterson. Lanyon enters the lab and finds Hyde dead, sitting in a chair. To his astonishment, he watches the creature transform into Jekyll. Discerning that his friend had committed suicide, Lanyon calls the others into the lab, where he informs them that Hyde has killed Jekyll. As the film ends, Millicent is grieving next to the body of Jekyll.

Cast 
 John Barrymore as Dr. Henry Jekyll / Mr. Edward Hyde/giant spider in dream
 Brandon Hurst as Sir George Carewe
 Martha Mansfield as Millicent Carewe, Sir George's daughter
 Charles Willis Lane as Dr. Richard Lanyon
 Cecil Clovelly as Edward Enfield
 Nita Naldi as Gina, the Italian exotic dancer
 Louis Wolheim as music hall proprietor

Uncredited 
 J. Malcolm Dunn as John Utterson
 George Stevens as Poole, Jekyll's butler
 Alma Aiken as distraught woman in Jekyll's office   
 Julia Hurley as Hyde's old landlady 
 Edgard Varèse as policeman 
 Blanche Ring as woman with elderly man in music hall
 Ferdinand Gottschalk as elderly man in music hall
 May Robson as old harridan standing outside music hall

Production notes

The early part of Jekyll's initial transformation into Hyde was achieved with no makeup, instead relying solely on Barrymore's ability to contort his face and body. The first time Hyde reverts to Jekyll, one of Hyde's prosthetic fingers can be seen flying across the screen, having been shaken loose by Barrymore's convulsions.
After Nita Naldi's death in 1961, The New York Times noted in its obituary of the actress that it was John Barrymore who had "obtained a part for her in the film, 'Dr. Jekyll and Mr. Hyde,'" after he "spotted" her dancing at the Winter Garden Theatre in Manhattan.

1920 screenplay alterations

The character of Millicent Carew does not appear in Stevenson's original novel, but rather in the 1887 stage version by Thomas Russell Sullivan starring Richard Mansfield. This 1920 film version used the play's concept of Jekyll being engaged to Carew's daughter, and Hyde beginning a dalliance with an attractive yet chaste dance-hall girl whom he destroys, to inject a coarse sexual undercurrent into Hyde's personality that Stevenson did not include in his novel.
 Beranger's screenplay strayed further from Stevenson's novel than any of the previous silent film adaptations, depicting Dr. Jekyll as a handsome, selfless, charitable saint, so "beautiful" physically as to appear "almost Godlike". She even noted that a halo effect should appear around him in certain scenes, while the character in the novel (a much older man) had by this stage in his life indulged in many guilty pleasures and was "duplicitous" to his friends.
 Beranger also has Hyde transform back into the handsome Dr. Jekyll after he dies from the poison, his profile shown in a beatific close-up, hinting that he has redeemed himself through suicide. In the novel, Stevenson has Jekyll die as Hyde and be forced to remain in "that damning form" for all eternity.
 Troy Howarth notes that this was the first adaptation of the novel that elevated the (George) Carew character to such prominence in the plot, making him "basically a variation on Oscar Wilde's Lord Henry Wotten (from Wilde's 1890 novel The Picture of Dorian Gray). Both men are sophisticated cads with a cynical point of view, and they both tempt the protagonists to ruin." By making Jekyll into "an easily manipulated pawn", the filmmakers make him "less responsible for his own actions and fate", and more "sympathetic". In her screenplay, Beranger writes of Carew, "Sir George waxes eloquent in his philosophy of Hedonism".
Another connection to Wilde's The Picture of Dorian Gray is the way Beranger has Hyde devolve into a more inhuman monster as he commits each evil deed. She noted in the script, "Though at first Hyde is misshapen and hideous...he is nothing like the unspeakable, vile-looking creature that he is at the end of the picture. This should be a gradual development of evil" (Hyde's bald head develops a strange point and his overbite becomes much more pronounced as the film proceeds).

Reception

Critical reception, 1920
In 1920, film critics in the trade media and in fan-based publications generally gave high marks to Dr. Jekyll and Mr. Hyde and, not surprisingly, focused chiefly on John Barrymore. The popular trade paper Variety described the production as a "fine and dignified presentation" with an "excellent" performance by Barrymore despite what the paper viewed as the absurd nature of the plot:

In the weeks following the release of Dr. Jekyll and Mr. Hyde in March 1920, media reports about the box-office receipts being generated by the film and the exorbitant prices being spent by "movie palaces" to rent it attest to the production's commercial success. On April 2, for example, Variety reported that the Rivoli Theatre, a prestigious entertainment venue in New York City, was already earning "enormous takings" from its screenings of the film. Variety also informed its readers that the Rivoli's management had paid $10,000 to the film's distributor just to rent the picture, which it noted was "probably a record price for a straight rental anywhere in the world".

With regard to broader public reaction to Dr. Jekyll and Mr. Hyde in 1920, fan-based publications and individual moviegoers expressed more mixed reactions to the film than critics in entertainment trade papers.  Some of those reviewers, like the title characters in the film, were "split", harboring both decidedly positive and negative opinions about the production. Photoplay, a widely read New York-based monthly, provides one example of such mixed reactions. In the magazine's June 1920 issue, critic Burns Mantle describes two of his friends' diametric responses to the picture. One friend praised it as "a perfect sample" of filmmaking, destined to be a "classic" in cinematic history; the other friend was appalled by it. As to his latter friend, Mantle adds that she "insists as strenuously that 'Dr. Jekyll and Mr. Hyde' gave her a most terrific attack of the blues from which she has yet to recover, nor expects to ever fully recover." Mantle's own feelings about the much-anticipated release were not so clear-cut:

Frederick James Smith, the "Celluloid Critic" for Motion Picture Classic, another major fan publication, considered Dr. Jekyll and Mr. Hyde "a finely workmanlike piece of screencraft". He did, though, caution his readers about Barrymore's appearance as Jekyll's inner beast. "His Hyde", Smith observed, "is a terrible being, with the most ghastly make-up we recall ever seeing in the films." In fact, audience exposure to Barrymore's Hyde became a point of concern expressed in some reviews, with his screen presence threatening the mental and even physical health of the public, especially for children exposed to the actor's  "ghoulish" character and the film’s possible "pre-natal influences" on expectant mothers.

Whatever reservations or warnings that film critics may have expressed about Dr. Jekyll and Mr. Hyde, they did not deter throngs of moviegoers in 1920 from seeing what Photoplay predicted would "easily become the most talked of picture of the time." The magazine illustrated that popularity when it reported, "A door and two windows were broken by the crowds that tried to see it on its first showing in New York".

More recent assessments
In 2014, American film critic and historian Leonard Maltin gave this version of Dr. Jekyll and Mr. Hyde three stars on a four-star rating scale. Maltin also complimented Barrymore's performances as both Jekyll and Hyde, as well as the film's overall production, describing it as "well made".

As of 2020, the film has an approval rating of 92% based on 13 reviews, with an average rating of 7.75/10, on review aggregator website Rotten Tomatoes.

Accolades
The film is recognized by American Film Institute in these lists:
 2001: AFI's 100 Years...100 Thrills – Nominated
 2003: AFI's 100 Years...100 Heroes & Villains:
 Dr. Jekyll – Nominated Hero

Home media
It was first released on VHS by Thorn EMI Video in June 1982. Years later, it was released to DVD by Kino on Video on October 9, 2001.

See also
 List of American films of 1920
The House That Shadows Built (1931 promotional film by Paramount)
John Barrymore on stage, screen and radio

References and notes

External links

 
 
 
 
 The AFI Catalog of Feature Films: Dr. Jekyll & Mr. Hyde

1920 films
American science fiction horror films
American silent feature films
Films based on horror novels
American black-and-white films
Films directed by John S. Robertson
Dr. Jekyll and Mr. Hyde films
Articles containing video clips
1920s science fiction horror films
Films set in London
1920 horror films
American films based on plays
1920s American films
Silent horror films